Hilda Christabel Bailey (29 June 1888 – 26 May 1971) was a British theatre and film actress. On stage from 1913, she was in both stage and film versions of Carnival in 1918 and 1921, respectively; and in the controversial crime film Cocaine in 1922.

Partial filmography

 Sisters in Arms (1918, Short) - WAAC Girl
 The Soul of Guilda Lois (1919)
 Under Suspicion (1919) - Countess Nada
 The Barton Mystery (1920) - Ethel Standish
 Carnival (1921) - Simonetta
 Cocaine (1922) - Madge Webster
 Flames of Passion (1922) - Kate Watson
 The Scandal (1923 film) (1923) - Charlotte
 The Woman Who Obeyed (1923) - Marion Dorchester
 The Secret Adversary (1929) - Rita van den Meer
 Head Office (1936) - Mrs. Braham
 Under a Cloud (1937) - Rosalyn Forbes
 Room for Two (1940) - Dressmaker
 The Farmer's Wife (1941) - Mrs. Rundle
 Jeannie (1941) - Mrs. Jansen
 Much Too Shy (1942) - Lady Driscoll
 Went the Day Well? (1942) - Cousin Maud
 I'll Walk Beside You (1943) - Mrs. Tremayne
 Madonna of the Seven Moons (1945) - Mrs. Fiske
 Give Me the Stars (1945) - Mrs. Ross
 Home Sweet Home (1945) - Mrs Wright
 I'll Turn to You (1946) - Gossiping Guest
 When You Come Home (1947) - Lady Langfield
 My Brother Jonathan (1948) - Mrs. Perry
 Bond Street (1948) - Madame
 Elizabeth of Ladymead (1948) - Mother in 1946
 School for Randle (1949) - Mrs. Andrews
 Golden Arrow (1949) - Mrs. Felton
 Madame Louise (1951) - Madame Louise (final film role)

References

External links

1888 births
1971 deaths
English stage actresses
English film actresses
English silent film actresses
Actresses from London
20th-century British actresses
20th-century English women
20th-century English people